René Angélil  (January 16, 1942 – January 14, 2016) was a Canadian musical producer, talent manager and singer. He was the manager and husband of singer Celine Dion.

Early life
Angélil was born in Montreal, Quebec, Canada, to a father of Syrian descent and a mother of Lebanese origin. His father, Joseph Angélil, was born in Montreal to parents from Damascus, Syria, and his mother, Alice Sara, was born in Montreal to Lebanese parents. He was the older of two children, he had a brother, André (born 1945). Both of his parents were members of the Melkite Greek Catholic Church. Angélil studied at Collège Saint-Viateur (high school), in Outremont and at Collège André-Grasset (post secondary), in Montreal.

Career
Angélil started out in 1961 as a pop singer in Montreal. He formed a pop rock group, Les Baronets (fr), with childhood friends Pierre Labelle and Jean Beaulne. Les Baronets had some hits during the 1960s, mostly translations of English-language pop hits from the United Kingdom or the United States, such as "C'est fou, mais c'est tout" in 1964 (a translation of The Beatles' song "Hold Me Tight"). After the dissolution of the group in 1972, Angélil and best friend Guy Cloutier began managing artists.

Together they managed the career of two successful Québec entertainers René Simard and Ginette Reno, among many other pop stars at the time. They parted ways in 1981 to each become solo managers. In 1981 (not long after being terminated as Ginette's manager and considering leaving the music business to pursue law school) René heard Celine Dion's demo tape when he was considered as a potential producer for her album. He soon took over as her agent. He continued as her manager until June 2014, when he stepped down because he had cancer.

Angélil became one of several co-owners of Montreal's iconic Schwartz's Deli in 2012.

Personal life

In 1966, Angélil married his first wife, Denyse Duquette. Their son Patrick was born in 1968, and they divorced in 1972. He married singer Anne Renée  in 1974; they had two children, Jean-Pierre (born 1974) and Anne-Marie Angélil (born 1977), then divorced in 1986. Anne-Marie married singer Marc Dupré in 2000.

Angélil, a well-known former singer-turned-manager, was sent a tape of then 12-year-old singer Celine Dion and invited her to audition in Quebec. He began managing her career, taking the teen and her mother on tour in Canada, Japan and Europe. He mortgaged his house to finance her first album in 1981.

Angélil and Dion began a personal relationship in 1988 when she was twenty years old. Their relationship began the night Celine won the Eurovision Song Contest on April 30, 1988.

They married on December 17, 1994, in a lavish wedding ceremony at Montreal's Notre-Dame Basilica, which was broadcast live on Canadian television.

After Angélil was diagnosed with cancer in 1999, and before beginning radiation treatment, the couple turned to in-vitro fertilization. Their efforts were extensively publicized. Their son René-Charles Angélil was born on January 25, 2001. Dion suffered a miscarriage in 2009, then gave birth to twin boys on October 23, 2010. The boys were named Eddy after Eddy Marnay, who produced Dion's first five albums, and Nelson Angélil after former South African president Nelson Mandela.

Angélil and Dion were huge fans of the Montreal Canadiens NHL hockey team and were good friends of former Quebec Nordiques/Colorado Avalanche president and general manager Pierre Lacroix.

Montreal Jubilation Choir founder Trevor Payne has said that "backstage, out of the eye of the general public, they were the kindest, most down-to-earth, superstars that I've ever known in my entire career."

Defamation suit
In 2001, Angélil and Dion filed a $5million defamation lawsuit against the Quebec tabloid Allô Vedettes, which claimed that the couple paid $5,001 to rent the swimming pool of Caesars Palace in Las Vegas so that Dion could sunbathe topless and Angélil could go skinny dipping. The couple strenuously denied the claim.

Gambling
Angélil was an avid poker player, having qualified for the 2005 World Series of Poker Tournament of Champions, and finishing in the money at the 2007 Mirage Poker Showdown event on the World Poker Tour, a series of high-stakes tournaments. Angélil was also rumoured to be a dedicated gambler away from the poker table. He reportedly gambled upwards of $1million a week at Caesars Palace, and kept a line of credit for the same amount at Bellagio. In 2007, Jan Jones, a casino executive and the former mayor of Las Vegas, claimed that Angélil gambled $1million a week, but later retracted the statement. Caesars Palace later released a statement of Angélil's gambling losses and wins with his permission.

Later life, illness and death
Angélil suffered a heart attack in 1991 at age 49. In 1999 he was diagnosed with throat cancer and made a full recovery after treatment. He appeared in the video for Simple Plan's song "Save You" as a survivor of cancer. In 2009, Angélil reportedly underwent a heart-related medical procedure to deal with arterial blockage. The procedure had been planned for months and was not heart surgery.

Angélil had surgery in December 2013 for throat cancer. In June 2014, Angélil stepped down as Dion's manager to focus on his health, but was still involved in business decisions related to her career. In September 2015, Dion announced that Angélil's cancer had progressed and that he had only "months to live". Angélil died on January 14, 2016, of throat cancer, two days before his 74th birthday. He received a "national funeral" service at Notre-Dame Basilica from the government of Quebec on January 22 and was buried at the Notre Dame des Neiges Cemetery.

Following Angélil's death, Dion became the sole owner and president of her management and production companies, including CDA Productions and Les Productions Feeling.

Legacy and honours
 1987 and 1988: Félix Award for Manager of the Year.
 June 2009: Awarded the National Order of Quebec, as Chevalier
 July 2013: Awarded the Order of Canada. 
 January 22, 2016: flags flew at half-mast on Quebec and Montreal government buildings in his memoriam and an official national funeral of the Quebec government was held in Notre-Dame Basilica
 February 15, 2016: Honoured by Grammy Award during its annual "In Memoriam" tribute.

Representation in other media
 In July 2008, Angélil was named the fictional principal for the reality television show Star Académie's fourth season in 2009. He filled the principal role in the show's two separate runs in 2009 and 2012.
 Angélil was portrayed by actor Enrico Colantoni in a 2008 television biopic of Dion, Céline.
 In the 2021 film Aline, directed by and starring Valérie Lemercier and loosely based on Dion's life, the character representing Angélil was portrayed by Sylvain Marcel, an actor from Dion's hometown of Charlemagne.

References

External links
 
 

1942 births
2016 deaths
Businesspeople from Montreal
Canadian Eastern Catholics
Canadian expatriates in the United States
Canadian gamblers
Canadian people of Lebanese descent
Canadian people of Syrian descent
Canadian poker players
Canadian pop singers
Deaths from cancer in Nevada
Celine Dion
Deaths from laryngeal cancer
Francophone Quebec people
French-language singers of Canada
Members of the Order of Canada
Canadian music managers
Singers from Montreal
Officers of the National Order of Quebec
Deaths from throat cancer
Middle Eastern Christians
Burials at Notre Dame des Neiges Cemetery